Carl Emmermann (6 March 1915 – 25 March 1990) was a German U-boat commander during World War II.

Career
Emmermann began his naval career in 1934. For some years he was training officer on the Naval Academy Mürwik, where future officers got their training.

In 1939 Emmermann joined the U-boat force and in November 1940 became the first Watch officer on  under the command of Hans Eckermann. On her first patrol UA only damaged the British steamer .

In November 1941 Emmermann took over his own boat, . He completed five patrols with this boat, in the Caribbean Sea, with the wolf pack Eisbär in South African waters, and in the North and South Atlantic.

His greatest success was the sinking of the British liner-troopship . After that patrol Emmermann became the commander of the 6th U-boat Flotilla in November 1943.

In August 1944 Emmermann became the chief of the Erprobungsgruppe Typ XXIII. There in late 1944 he wrote the battle instructions for the new Type XXIII U-boat.

Along with some other U-boat men he took part in infantry duty around Hamburg as commander of Marine-Battalion Emmermann.

Emmermann survived the war and later returned to Germany, studied engineering and prospered in business.

Awards
Wehrmacht Long Service Award 4th Class (5 April 1938)
Iron Cross (1939)
 2nd Class (19 March 1941)
 1st Class (2 August 1941)
U-boat War Badge (1939) (2 August 1941)
 with Diamonds (1 October 1943)
War Merit Cross 2nd Class with Swords (1 September 1944)
U-boat Front Clasp (1 October 1944)
Knight's Cross of the Iron Cross with Oak Leaves
 Knights Cross on 27 November 1942 as Kapitänleutnant and commander of U-172
 256th Oak Leaves on 4 July 1943 as Kapitänleutnant and commander of U-172

References

Citations

Bibliography

 
 
 
 

1915 births
1990 deaths
Military personnel from Hamburg
Reichsmarine personnel
U-boat commanders (Kriegsmarine)
Recipients of the Knight's Cross of the Iron Cross with Oak Leaves